Cover is a surname. Notable people with the surname include:

 Arthur Byron Cover (born 1950), American science fiction author
 Franklin Cover (1928–2006), American actor
 Thomas M. Cover (1938–2012), American scientist
 Robert Cover (1943–1986), American law professor, scholar, and activist